Dania Pérez Serrano (born 24 July 1973) is a track and road cyclist from Cuba. She represented her nation at the 1996 Summer Olympics on the road in the women's road race and on the track in the women's points race. At the 2000 Summer Olympics she competed in the women's road race.

Notes

References

External links
 
 
 
 

1973 births
Living people
Cuban female cyclists
Olympic cyclists of Cuba
Cyclists at the 1996 Summer Olympics
Cyclists at the 2000 Summer Olympics
Pan American Games medalists in cycling
Pan American Games bronze medalists for Cuba
Cyclists at the 1995 Pan American Games
Medalists at the 1995 Pan American Games
Central American and Caribbean Games medalists in cycling
Central American and Caribbean Games silver medalists for Cuba
Competitors at the 1998 Central American and Caribbean Games
Sportspeople from Camagüey
20th-century Cuban women
21st-century Cuban women